This is a list of episodes from the twenty-third season of the anime series Nintama Rantarō. The season aired on NHK since March 30, 2015.

The opening theme is "Yūki 100% (2012)" (勇気100%・2012 "Courage 100% 2012") by Sexy Zone. The ending theme is "Matta Nante na Shitsu!" (待ったなんてなしっ!) also by Sexy Zone.

Episode list

References

Nintama Rantarō episode lists